The 116th Independent Brigade of the Territorial Defense Forces is a military formation of the Territorial Defense Forces of Ukraine in Poltava Oblast. It is part of Operational Command North.

History

Formation 
On 25 June 2018 the brigade was formed in Poltava Oblast. From 25 to 29 September units of brigade took part in large strategic command-staff training "Cossack Volition – 2018". By the end of 2018, more than 4,000 reservist completed rifle days, where they received basic training and instructions on how to fulfill their duties as territorial defense forces.

In June 2019 Brigade held a large scale, 7 day exercise.

On 17 February 2022 Brigade commander Lieutenant colonel Kalentiev Kostiantyn informed that brigade had a core of 300 contract officers, sergeants and soldiers.

Russo-Ukrainian War

2022 Russian invasion of Ukraine
When on 26 February Russian Armed Forces invaded, they reached North-East parts of Poltava Oblast. First battle happened in Vepryk. During the night of 26-27 February units of the brigade along with various regular Ukrainian Armed Forces formations, destroyed 2 columns in vicinity of Hadiach. On containing 29 vehicles and another 150. For more than 10 days heavy battles raged on border of Poltava and Sumy Oblasts. Each time Russian forces tried to cross Sula river, they were stopped by artillery units of the Brigade. In those battles brigade captured lots of enemy tanks, artillery and anti-aircraft guns. On 9 March Brigade destroyed another enemy column, capturing 3 tanks which were transferred to regular army units.

In January 2023 units of the Brigade were fighting near Soledar and Bakhmut.

Structure 
As of 2022 the brigade's structure is as follows:
 Headquarters
 144th Territorial Defense Battalion (Poltava) А7310
 145th Territorial Defense Battalion (Kremenchuk) А7311
 146th Territorial Defense Battalion (Hadiach) А7312
 147th Territorial Defense Battalion (Lubny) А7313
 148th Territorial Defense Battalion (Myrhorod) А7314
 149th Territorial Defense Battalion (Lokhvytsia) А7315
 Counter-Sabotage Company
 Engineering Company
 Communication Company
 Logistics Company
 Mortar Battery

Commanders 
 Lieutenant colonel Kalentiev Kostiantyn 2019 - February 2022
 Colonel Chakhlov Oleksandr February 2022 - present

See also 
 Territorial Defense Forces of the Armed Forces of Ukraine

References 

Territorial defense Brigades of Ukraine
2018 establishments in Ukraine
Military units and formations established in 2018